Tiberiu Bărbulețiu (born 1 December 1963 in Blaj) is a Romanian politician. He is a member of the National Liberal Party. He was a member of the Romanian Chamber of Deputies between 2004 and 2008, and was also a Member of the European Parliament from 2007 to 2009, part of the Alliance of Liberals and Democrats for Europe.

References 
 Tiberiu BĂRBULEŢIU Parliamentary activity in legislature 2004-2008
European Parliament official photo

1963 births
Living people
National Liberal Party (Romania) politicians
People from Blaj
Politehnica University of Bucharest alumni
National Liberal Party (Romania) MEPs
MEPs for Romania 2007
MEPs for Romania 2007–2009